Bumba is a town and river port in Mongala Province, in the northern part of the Democratic Republic of Congo, lying on the River Congo.  As of 2009 it had an estimated population of 107,626. The town has neither electricity nor running water.

Transport 

The  narrow gauge Vicicongo line from Bumba to Isiro as of 2007 is not operational (see Transport in DR Congo). The town is served by Bumba Airport. The Congo River serves as the main transportation artery.

Notable People 
 Marcel Lihau

See also 
 List of railway stations in the Democratic Republic of the Congo
 Dr. Ngoy Mushola, the first person to record a description of Ebola.
 AS Lokole

References

Populated places in Mongala